Darren Carr is an Australian ventriloquist and comedian.

Career
In 2013, Carr auditioned and made it to the Semi-Final of the season 7 of Australia's Got Talent.

Awards

Mo Awards
The Australian Entertainment Mo Awards (commonly known informally as the Mo Awards), were annual Australian entertainment industry awards. They recognise achievements in live entertainment in Australia from 1975 to 2016. Darren Carr has won 18 awards.
 (wins only)
|-
| 2001
| Darren Carr
| Specialty Performer
| 
|-
| 2003
| Darren Carr
| Specialty Performer
| 
|-
| 2004
| Darren Carr
| Specialty Performer
| 
|-
|rowspan="2"| 2006
| Darren Carr
| Versatile Performer
| 
|-
| Darren Carr
| Specialty Performer
| 
|-
|rowspan="3"| 2007
| Darren Carr
| Versatile Performer
| 
|-
| Darren Carr
| Specialty Performer
| 
|-
| Darren Carr
| Peter Allen Performer of the Year
| 
|-
|rowspan="2"| 2008
| Darren Carr
| Specialty Performer
| 
|-
| Darren Carr
| Peter Allen Performer of the Year
| 
|-
| 2009
| Darren Carr
| Specialty Performer
| 
|-
| 2010
| Darren Carr
| Best Specialty Act
| 
|-
| 2011
| Darren Carr
| Best Specialty Act
| 
|-
| 2012
| Darren Carr
| Best Specialty Act
| 
|-
|rowspan="3"| 2014
| Darren Carr
| Best Specialty Act
| 
|-
| Darren Carr
| Comedy Act of the Year
| 
|-
| Darren Carr
| Peter Allen Performer of the Year
| 
|-
| 2016
| Darren Carr
| Comedy Act of the Year
| 
|-

References 

Living people
Australian comedians
Ventriloquists
Year of birth missing (living people)
Australia's Got Talent contestants